Sound Loaded is the sixth studio album by Puerto Rican singer Ricky Martin. It was released on November 14, 2000, by Columbia Records. Following the huge success of his first English album, Ricky Martin (1999), Martin returned to the studio to record its follow-up English album. He worked with producers Walter Afanasieff, Emilio Estefan, Draco Rosa, and Desmond Child to create the album. Musically, Sound Loaded consists of dance club tracks, pop songs, adult contemporary ballads, and mid-tempo Latin numbers.  After the album's release, Martin embarked on a North American promotional tour.

The album was supported by three singles. The lead single "She Bangs" topped the charts in seven countries and reached the top five in Australia, Canada, the United Kingdom, and several other countries. The second single "Nobody Wants to Be Lonely" was re-recorded along with American singer Christina Aguilera and became a number one and top five hit around the world. "Loaded" was released as the album's final single and experienced moderate commercial success. Sound Loaded received generally favorable reviews from music critics, who complimented its dance tracks. The album was a commercial success. It debuted at number four on the US Billboard 200 with first-week sales of 318,000 copies. It also reached the top-five in Australia, Canada, Spain, Sweden, and Switzerland. It has received several certifications, including triple platinum in Canada and double platinum in the United States, and has sold over seven million copies worldwide.

Background and recording
Ricky Martin released his fifth studio album and English-language debut, Ricky Martin in 1999, which became his biggest commercial success, debuting at number one on the US Billboard 200 chart and selling over 15 million copies worldwide. To further promote the album, he embarked on the worldwide Livin' la Vida Loca Tour. While the Livin' la Vida Loca Tour had not been concluded yet, Columbia Records asked Martin to return to the studio to record his sixth studio album. He later  wrote about the request in Me, his official autobiography: "Now, when I think about it, I realize I should have said no. Definitely no! It was too soon and I was not ready to fully immerse myself in the intense creative work needed to record a new album." He reflected on it as "one of the worst decisions" of his life and "a very serious mistake". In October 2000, Rolling Stone revealed the album's title as Sound Loaded, mentioning that it is an English album set for release on November 14, 2000. During an interview with the CNN, Martin explained the idea behind the album's title:

The singer worked on the album with several producers and songwriters, including Walter Afanasieff, Emilio Estefan, Draco Rosa, and Desmond Child, and recorded it in Miami. During an interview with Billboard Martin explained: "It might sound clichéd, but it was my dream team. It was a situation devoid of egos. It was all about creativity. Everyone was open to working toward the same goal, which was to make the best possible record."

Music and lyrics

Sound Loaded is a primarily English language album composed of 15 songs, consisting dance club tracks, pop songs, adult contemporary ballads, and mid-tempo Latin numbers. "She Bangs" is a dance song that features Latin and salsa music influences. The song's instrumentation features "powerful" percussion, trumpet blasts, and tropical beats. Lyrically, it tells a "tale of a wild woman who may be hard to let go and even harder to hold", which is "a metaphor for the universe". The album also contains a Spanish-language version of "She Bangs", which was recorded under the same title. "Saint Tropez" has Brazilian influences with a "delectable" 1980's vibe, using a "passionate" trumpet solo. "Come to Me" is a pop love song and ballad, featuring elements of flamenco. It also has a Spanish version titled "Ven A Mí". On "Loaded", Martin combines 1960's pop and Latin music with "hard rock vocal intonations". The album also contains a Spanish-language version of the song, titled "Dame Más".

"Nobody Wants to Be Lonely" is a mid-tempo pop song and power ballad, featuring elements of flamenco and Latin music. The track is a love song about "heartbreak" and "longing", as well as "love, lose, and hope". "Amor" is a Latin-flavored Spanglish salsa and dance club song, with Cuban influences, that uses "a percussion break, a truncated pop-rock guitar solo, and a lazy, lolling piano". A salsa track using a "tip-top" piano, "Jezabel" talks about a woman's "ruthless romantic ambitions". "The Touch" is a power ballad, while the gypsy-tinged "One Night Man" features elements of salsa and Arabic music. In the energetic "Are You In It for Love", the singer suspects that his lover is "in it for kicks, private jets and Armani / And when the ride's over, will you even bother to call me?". "If You Ever Saw Her" is a fusion of pop-soul, glam rock, and urban contemporary music. The last track on the album, "Cambia la Piel" is a Spanish song, "marked by bleating horns, jagged electric guitar lines, and staccato counter-rhythms".

Singles
Columbia Records released "She Bangs" to radio stations in several countries on September 22, 2000 as the lead single from the album. Thereafter, the song was released to the singles markets in October. The track was commercially successful, reaching number one in Argentina, Chile, Hong Kong, Italy, South Africa, Sweden, and Uruguay, as well as the top five in Australia, Canada, the United Kingdom, and several other countries. It was nominated for Best Male Pop Vocal Performance at the 43rd Annual Grammy Awards. The Spanish-language version of "She Bangs" reached the summit of the Billboard Hot Latin Tracks chart. "Nobody Wants to Be Lonely" was re-recorded along with American singer Christina Aguilera in December 2000. The duet was released to radio stations in the United States, on January 9, 2001, as the second single from the album. The single peaked at number one in Hungary, New Zealand, Romania, Poland, and Croatia, as well as the top five in Italy, Germany, Spain, and the United Kingdom, among others. It was nominated for Best Pop Collaboration with Vocals at the 44th Annual Grammy Awards. A Spanish-language solo version of the song, entitled "Sólo Quiero Amarte", was recorded by Martin and topped the Hot Latin Tracks chart.

Both "She Bangs" and "Nobody Wants to Be Lonely" reached the top-15 on the US Billboard Hot 100 chart and has been certified silver in the UK. The album's final single, "Loaded", was launched on April 17, 2001; it became a top-20 hit in Belgium, Romania, Spain, Sweden, and the United Kingdom. In the United States, it peaked at number 97 on the Hot 100. "Cambia la Piel" released as the only promotional single from Sound Loaded on October 15, 2001. Music videos were filmed for both English and Spanish versions of "She Bangs", "Nobody Wants to Be Lonely", "Sólo Quiero Amarte", "Loaded", and "Dame Más". The Spanish-language visual for "She Bangs" won the Latin Grammy Award for Best Music Video at the 2nd Annual Latin Grammy Awards, Video of the Year at the 13th Lo Nuestro Awards, and the Best Clip of the Year — Latin at the Billboard Music Video Awards. "Nobody Wants to Be Lonely" video won the award for Outstanding Music Video at the 2002 ALMA Awards.

Marketing

Release
Sound Loaded was released by Columbia Records on November 14, 2000. The American edition contains a Spanglish radio edit for "She Bangs", titled "She Bangs (Obadam's Spanglish Radio Edit)" in addition to the standard track list. The Latin American edition of Sound Loaded includes "Sólo Quiero Amarte", while "Are You In It For Love" is not featured. Since Martin re-recorded "Nobody Wants to Be Lonely" with Aguilera after the album's original release, the duet was added to the album's track list later. The collaboration was not released in a major commercially available single format in the United States, and consumers could purchase the song only with buying the album. Those who had already bought the album could download it from Martin's website for free or mail a sticker from their copy of the album, receiving a free CD with the new version. In all regions, the re-issue used the same track list as the original and the duet was added as the second disc.

Live performances

To further promote Sound Loaded, Martin embarked on a North American promotional tour. The tour began on November 13, 2000, at the Irving Plaza in New York City, and concluded on February 26, 2001, at the Guvernment in Toronto, with five concerts throughout the United States, Mexico, and Canada. In addition to his tour, Martin performed singles from Sound Loaded on many television programs and award shows. He performed "She Bangs" at the 2000 Billboard Music Awards, the 2000 MTV Europe Music Awards, the 43rd Annual TV Week Logie Awards, the Today Show, Saturday Night Live,  Al Fin de Semana, and Otro Rollo. The singer performed "Nobody Wants to Be Lonely" at the 28th Annual American Music Awards on January 8, 2001. Later that year, he and Aguilera gave live performances of their collaboration on The Tonight Show with Jay Leno, the ITV's CD:UK, and the 13th Annual World Music Awards. In the same year, Martin also performed "Cambia la Piel" at the Premios de la Música and "Loaded" at the Blockbuster Entertainment Awards.  To promote the album's material in the United Kingdom, he delivered performances of "She Bangs", "Nobody Wants to Be Lonely" (with Aguilera), and "Loaded" on the BBC's Top of the Pops in November 2000, January 2001, and July 2001, respectively. In July 2001, Martin performed "She Bangs" and "Loaded" at the Allsång på Skansen, becoming the first "world-famous pop artist" ever to perform at the show, while breaking the record of its highest-attendance show with drawing an audience of 15,000.

Critical reception

Sound Loaded received generally favorable reviews from music critics. At Metacritic, which assigns a normalized rating out of 100 to reviews from mainstream critics, the album received an average score of 64 based on 6 reviews. Gary Graff from Wall of Sound gave it a positive review, saying it "is indeed loaded with sound, from lush love ballads to full-on polyrhythmic explosions made explicitly for bon-bon shaking" and all 15 tracks "sound as polished and lively as they do". He highlighted "Cambia la Piel" as the album's "most interesting track", describing it as "an edgy gem marked by bleating horns, jagged electric guitar lines, and staccato counter-rhythms". Writing for Rolling Stones, Arion Berger called the album "relentlessly likable and danceable", while introducing "Loaded" as the best track. An author of Billboard noted "a smattering of well-crafted material" in the album on which Martin is "allowed to truly strut his vocal stuff", highlighting "The Touch" and "Come To Me" as "lovely ballads". The critic thought that unlike Ricky Martin, there is "less of an attempt to fall in line with trends" and Martin trusted "listeners to subscribe to more traditional pop sounds", which resulted in "a more consistent recording". They also praised Martin's "special attention to his Latin roots by including a handful of solid Spanish-language tunes" that made the set "an album that offers a little something for everyone".

Charlotte Robinson from PopMatters mentioned "Nobody Wants to Be Lonely" and "The Touch" as the "lowlights" of Sound Loaded and labeled them "crummy ballads", while praising dance numbers such as "She Bangs" and "Loaded", as well as mid-tempo tracks. She highlighted "Amor" as one of the best mid-tempo songs in the collection and described "Cambia la Piel" as fabulous, adding the fact that the latter "prove once again that Martin is the only one of the stars of the 'Latin explosion' who actually makes Latin-sounding music on a regular basis". Similarly, AllMusic's Jose F. Promis called the album "a lushly produced set", praising its Latin-flavored dance tracks, including "Amor", "Jezabel", "Cambia La Piel", and "If You Ever Saw Her", describing the last one as endearing. He also stated that "She Bangs" is arguably one of best songs of the 2000s. Nevertheless, he thought that the ballads "tend to weigh the album down", introducing "Come to Me" and "The Touch" as "unmemorable" tracks.

Accolades
At the 7th Blockbuster Entertainment Awards, Sound Loaded was nominated for Favorite Male Artist of the Year and Favorite Artist — Latino, but lost them to Eminem's The Marshall Mathers LP (2000) and Christina Aguilera's Mi Reflejo (2000), respectively. Subsequently, it won the award for Favorite Male Artist — Pop at the ceremony. The album was also among the winning albums as the ten best-selling foreign releases at the 2001 Hong Kong Top Sales Music Awards.

Commercial performance
Sound Loaded debuted at number four on the Billboard 200 with first-week sales of 318,000 copies, according to data compiled by Nielsen SoundScan for the chart dated December 2, 2000, becoming Martin's second top-five album on the list. It also debuted at number four on Billboards Top Internet Album Sales chart in the same week. Although the album was released in November, it was ranked among the best-selling albums of 2000 in the United States, selling over 1.1 million copies in the country. In December 2000, it was certified double platinum by the Recording Industry Association of America (RIAA), denoting shipments of over two million copies in the US. As of January 2011, it has sold over 1,679,000 copies in the country, according to Nielsen SoundScan, making it Martin's second best-selling album in the US, only behind Ricky Martin (1999).

Sound Loaded debuted at number three in Australia, on the chart issue dated November 19, 2000. It was later certified double platinum by the Australian Recording Industry Association (ARIA), denoting shipments of over 140,000 copies in the country. In Canada, it peaked at number three on the Billboards Canadian Albums Chart and was certified triple platinum by the Canadian Recording Industry Association (CRIA), denoting shipments of over 300,000 units in the region. The album also reached number three in Spain, where it was certified double platinum by the Productores de Música de España (Promusicae), denoting shipments of over 200,000 copies. Additionally, Sound Loaded reached the top-10 in Argentina, Italy, Japan, New Zealand, Sweden, and Switzerland. In the United Kingdom, the album was certified platinum by the British Phonographic Industry (BPI), denoting shipments of over 300,000 copies in the country. As of November 2006, the album has sold over seven million copies worldwide.

Track listing

Personnel 

Credits for Sound Loaded adapted from AllMusic and the album liner notes.

Recording and mixing locations 

 Sony Music Studios, New York City
 The Hit Factory Criteria, Miami
 The Gentlemen's Club, Miami Beach, Florida
 Wallyworld, Pittsburgh
 Capitol Studios, Hollywood, California
 Airborn Studios, Indianapolis
 Quad Recording Studios, Nashville, Tennessee
 Crescent Moon Studios, Coral Terrace, Florida
 Cello 1 Studios, Los Angeles
 Tone King Studios, Los Angeles
 Kokopelli Studios, Miami
 Dreamhouse Studios, London
 Rumbo Recorders, Canoga Park, Los Angeles
 WorldBeat Recordings, Calabasas, California
 Big Dog Studios, Miami
 Barking Doctor Studios Mount Kisco, New York
 Sterling Sound, New York City

Musicians and technical 

 Ricky Martin performer, primary artist, vocals, executive producer, background vocals, percussion
 Robi Rosa arranger, composer, executive  producer, producer, vocal arrangement, background vocals
 Desmond Child composer, piano, producer, vocal producer
 Walter Afanasieff composer, drum programming, keyboards, producer, programming
 George Noriega arranger, composer, guitar, keyboards, producer, programming, vocal arrangement, background vocals
 Emilio Estefan, Jr. arranger, producer
 Jon Secada composer, vocal arrangement, vocal producer
 KC Porter arranger, engineer, keyboards, producer, programming, background vocals
 Randall Barlow arranger, horn arrangements, keyboards, producer, programming, trumpet
 Daniel Lopez composer, percussion, producer, background vocals
 Steve Morales arranger, composer, keyboards, producer, vocal producer
 Pete Amato arranger, composer, drum programming, keyboards
 Mark Taylor composer, keyboards, mixing, producer, programming
 Manny López composer, guitar
 Gary Burr composer, guitar
 David Siegel composer, keyboards
 Paul Barry composer, background vocals
 Randy Barlow composer
 Roberto Blades composer
 Kara DioGuardi composer
 Alberto Gaitán composer
 James Goodwin composer
 Glenn Monroig composer
 David Resnik composer
 Liza Quintana composer
 Victoria Shaw composer
 Julia Sierra composer
 Diane Warren composer
 Murray Adler violin
 Pablo Alfaro photography
 Pedro Alfonso violin
 Rusty Anderson guitar, electric guitar
 Wayne Andre trombone
 Marcelo Añez engineer
 Tommy Anthony background vocals
 Iris Aponte project coordinator
 Chris Apostle production coordination
 Kenny Aronoff drums
 Eric Bazilian guitar
 Bob Becker viola
 Tom Bender assistant engineer
 Kurt Berge technical support
 Herb Besson trombone (bass)
 Greg Bieck digital  programming, engineer
 Charlie Bisherat violin
 Curt Bisquera drums
 Oswald Wiz Bone engineer
 Gustavo Bonnet assistant engineer
 Larry Brooks assistant engineer
 Denyse Buffum viola
 Olbin Burgos drums
 Eve Butler violin
 Alex Caballero technical support
 Cachao bass, soloist
 Danny Cahn trumpet
 Ed Calle horn, saxophone
 Scott Canto engineer
 Randy Cantor keyboards, programming, rhythm  arrangements
 Chris Carroll engineer
 Gustavo Celis engineer
 Susan Chatman violin
 Steve Churchyard string engineer
 Brian Coleman production coordination
 Ramses Colón bass
 Tony Concepcion horn, trumpet
 Bob Conley programming
 Luis Conte percussion
 Michael Contratto background vocals
 Larry Corbett cello
 Ricardo Cordero project coordinator
 Mike Couzzi engineer
 Ronnie Cuber baritone sax 
 Sal Cuevas bass, electric bass
 Ian Cuttler art direction, design
 Joel Derouin concert master
 Michelle Diaz piano
 Kevin Dillon studio coordinator
 Glenn Drewes trumpet
 Bruce Dukov violin
 Charles Dye engineer
 Rob Eaton engineer, mixing
 Ernie Erhardt cello
 Gyan Evans background vocals
 Benny Faccone mixing
 Matthew Funes viola
 Marco Gamboa engineer
 Armen Garabedian violin
 Berj Garabedian violin
 Earl Gardner trumpet
 Hector Garrido horn arrangements, piano, string arrangements, string Conductor
 Steve Genewick assistant engineer
 David Gleeson engineer
 Conrad Golding assistant engineer
 Jules Gondar engineer, mixing
 Jorge Gonzalez assistant engineer
 Roger Gonzalez assistant engineer
 Erwin Gorostiza art direction
 Endre Granat concert master, violin
 Ron Grant background vocals
 Maurice Grants cello
 Matt Gruber engineer
 Mick Guzauski mixing
 Jim Hacker trumpet
 Mike Harvey background vocals
 Clayton Haslop violin
 John Hayhurst viola
 Scott Healy horn arrangements
 Paquito Hechevarria piano
 John Hendrickson assistant engineer
 Dino Hermann assistant engineer, engineer
 Gerry Hilera violin
 Jennifer Hilliard assistant engineer, engineer
 Jimmy Hoyson assistant engineer
 Joanna Ifrah A&R
 Ted Jensen mastering
 Steve Juliani librarian
 Suzie Katayama cello, string contractor
 Peter Kent violin
 Scott Kieklak assistant engineer
 Renita Koven viola
 Sebastián Krys engineer, mixing
 Gary Kuo violin
 Damien Kutny assistant engineer
 Abraham Laboriel, Sr. drums
 Nanette Lamboy project coordinator
 Michael Landau acoustic guitar, electric guitar, soloist
 Maurice Lauchner background vocals
 Gustavo Laureano background vocals
 Dan Lawrence production coordination
 Calanit Ledani chant
 Will Lee background vocals
 Leyla Leeming production coordination
 Mario de León violin
 Brian Leonard violin
 Lee Levin drums
 Jolie Levine-Aller production coordination
 Linda Lipsett viola
 Larry Loftin background vocals
 Craig Lozowick assistant engineer, engineer
 José Juan Maldonado production coordination
 Nathan Malki assistant engineer, engineer
 Andy Manganno assistant engineer
 Fabian Marasciullo assistant engineer
 Tony Mardini assistant engineer
 Miguel Martinez cello
 Tony Maserati mixing
 Michael Matthews cello
 Peter McCabe engineer
 Darrin McCann viola
 Hugh McDonald bass
 Ángelo Medina executive  producer
 Steve Menezes studio coordinator
 Joe Meyer French horn
 Mike Migliore alto sax
 Tim Mitchell guitar, electric guitar
 Wanda Montes hair stylist
 Jorge Moraga viola
 Carole Mukogawa viola
 Herman "Teddy" Mulet cuatro, horn arrangements, trombone, trumpet
 Posie Muliadi assistant engineer
 Illyak Negroni background vocals
 Robbie Nevil background vocals
 Joe Novo assistant engineer
 Brian O'Connor French horn
 Keith O'Quinn trombone
 Germán Ortiz assistant engineer, engineer
 Ricardo "Tiki" Pasillas percussion
 Andy Pechenik technical support
 Archie Pena percussion
 John Pena bass
 Mark Pender trumpet
 Robert Peterson violin
 Adam Phillips guitar
 Lenny Pickett tenor sax
 Tim Pierce electric guitar
 Freddy Piñero, Jr. engineer
 Jeff Poe engineer
 Vladimir Polimatidi violin
 Karie Prescott viola
 Rachel Purkin violin
 Luis Quine assistant engineer, engineer
 Cheito Quinonez background vocals
 Brian Rawling drums
 Dave Reitzas engineer
 Michele Richards violin
 Steve Richards cello, viola
 Mike Rivera assistant engineer
 Richie Rosenberg trombone
 Anatoly Rosinsky violin
 Nancy Roth viola
 Maital Sabbon make-up
 Alan Sanderson assistant engineer, engineer
 Arturo Sandoval flugelhorn, trumpet
 Carlos Santos assistant engineer
 Stephen Saper authoring
 Eric Schilling engineer
 Aaron Shannon assistant engineer
 José Sibaja trumpet
 Dan Smith cello
 Rafael Solano percussion
 Ramón Stagnaro cavaquinho, cuatro, acoustic guitar, guitar (nylon string), tres
 Sheldon Steiger engineer
 Edmund Stein violin
 Rudy Stein cello
 Shane Stoner engineer
 Paul Stura stylist
 Sarah Sykes production coordination
 Carl Tallarico production coordination
 Ron Taylor engineer
 Dana Teboe horn, trombone
 Ken Theis assistant engineer
 David Thoener mixing
 Regine Thorre make-up
 Rene Toledo acoustic guitar, soloist
 Nestor Torres flute
 Alexander Trainer graphic design
 Walter Turbitt mixing
 Juan Turek assistant engineer
 Camilo Valencia horn, horn arrangements
 Jose Luis Vega image design
 Jerry Vivino tenor sax
 Chris Wiggins assistant engineer
 Ed Williams assistant engineer
 Chris Willis background vocals
 Evan Wilson viola
 Ken Yerke violin
 Jong Uk Yoon assistant engineer
 Sandy Yuzon graphic design

Charts

Weekly charts

Year-end charts

Certifications and sales

Release history

See also

 2000 in music
 List of top 25 albums for 2000 in Australia

References

2000 albums
Ricky Martin albums
Columbia Records albums
Albums produced by Walter Afanasieff
Albums produced by Draco Rosa